19th Rifle Division can refer to:

19th Guards Rifle Division
19th Motor Rifle Division